Sportsklubben Falk is a Norwegian sports club from Horten, Vestfold. It has sections for association football and handball.

It was founded in 1917 as a football club; the handball came in the 1940s. The club had an athletics section from 1920 to 1924, when it broke out and formed the club Horten FIK. Falk also had a bandy section from 1945 to 1949, when it broke out and formed the club Horten BK. In 1945 Falk absorbed the club Horten SK.

The men's football team currently plays in the Fourth Division, the fifth tier of Norwegian football, after being relegated from the Third Division in 2010. It last played in the Second Division in 1997.

References

 Official site 

Football clubs in Norway
Sport in Vestfold og Telemark
Horten
Association football clubs established in 1917
Bandy clubs established in 1917
Handball clubs established in 1917
Defunct athletics clubs in Norway
Defunct bandy clubs in Norway
1917 establishments in Norway